Alejandro Francisco Ballestero de Diego (Madrid, Spain, 4 October 1969) is a Spanish politician who belongs to the People's Party (PP).

Single, Ballestero qualified as a lawyer. In 1993 he began to work for the regional administration of his home region of Castilla-La Mancha and in 1995 worked as a technical adviser to the PP group in the parliament of Castilla- La Mancha. He resigned after one year when he was elected to the Spanish Congress of Deputies representing Toledo Province. He was re-elected in 2000, 2004 and 2008, but did not stand at the 2011 election.

References

Members of the 6th Congress of Deputies (Spain)
Members of the 7th Congress of Deputies (Spain)
Members of the 8th Congress of Deputies (Spain)
Members of the 9th Congress of Deputies (Spain)
1969 births
Living people
People from Madrid
People's Party (Spain) politicians